{{Infobox person
| name          = Srujan Lokesh
| image         = Srujan Lokesh (3).jpg
| caption       = Srujan Lokesh (2019)
| birth_date    = 
| birth_place   = Bangalore, Karnataka, India
| nationality   = Indian
| alma_mater    = SSMRV college, Bengaluru
| television    = * Maja talkies (2011)
 Sye Majaa Talkies (2015) 
| spouse        = 
| children      = 
| parents       = 
| relatives     = 
| occupation    = Actor, Producer, television presenter
}}

Srujan Lokesh (born 28 June 1980) is an Indian actor, television presenter, radio presenter and producer who mainly works in the Kannada film industry. 

Production house
Lokesh Productions was founded by Srujan Lokesh and his mother Girija Lokesh in 2013. The production house has produced several shows on television including Challenge, Chota Champion and Kaasige Toss, all being reality shows. Currently, the house produces Majaa Talkies'', a sketch comedy show.

Awards and honours 
 Suvarna Channel award: Best Anchor (2011)
 Bigg entertainment award: Most popular category Best Anchor (2011)
 Maadyama award: Best Anchor (2012, 2013)

Filmography

Television

References

External links
 http://newindianexpress.com/entertainment/kannada/article600307.ece NewIndianExpress. 4 September 2012
 http://www.cinekannada.com/celebrity-detail/srujan-lokesh-profile/ www.cinekannada.com. 9 July 2013

1980 births
Living people
Indian male film actors
Indian male television actors
Indian stand-up comedians
Male actors in Kannada cinema
Indian game show hosts
Indian radio presenters
21st-century Indian male actors
Male actors from Bangalore
Male actors in Kannada television
Bigg Boss Kannada contestants